Chalmasia is a genus of green algae in the family Polyphysaceae.

The genus name of Chalmasia is in honour of Ernest Charles Philippe Auguste Munier-Chalmas (1843–1903), who was a French geologist.

The genus was circumscribed by Hermann zu Solms-Laubach in Trans. Linn. Soc. London, Bot. ser.2, vol.5 on pages 2, 9, 32 and 34 in 1895.

References

External links

Ulvophyceae genera
Dasycladales